Eric Matthew Simonoff is a literary agent at William Morris Endeavor.

Biography
Eric Simonoff was born to a Jewish family  in Philadelphia on July 21, 1967. He graduated from Princeton University in 1989, with a degree in Classics. Simonoff began his publishing career at W.W. Norton as an editorial assistant, then joined Janklow & Nesbit in 1991 and rose to the position of co-director. He left Janklow & Nesbit for William Morris Endeavor in 2009. His switch in agencies was considered a major event in the publishing industry. Simonoff represents more than a dozen New York Times bestselling authors.

List of clients

 Jonathan Lethem
 Philipp Meyer, author of The Son
 Douglas Preston, author of The Monster of Florence: A True Story
 Vikram Chandra
 Stephen Chbosky, author of The Perks of Being a Wallflower
 Lincoln Child
 Andrew Davidson
 James Frey, controversial author of A Million Little Pieces.
 Bob Greene
 Edward P. Jones, Pulitzer prize winner.
 Jhumpa Lahiri, Pulitzer prize winner.
 Alexander Maksik, novelist
 Thisbe Nissen
 Trenton Lee Stewart
 Walter Kirn
 Stacy Schiff, Pulitzer prize winner
 Ian W. Toll
 Danielle Trussoni
 Nam Le
 Qian Julie Wang
 The New Yorker Magazine
 Phil Klay, author of Redeployment
 Chris Robinson and Gavin Kovite, authors of War of the Encyclopaedists
 Yaa Gyasi

References

1967 births
Literary agents
20th-century American Jews
Living people
21st-century American Jews